Judit Varga may refer to:

 Judit Varga (athlete) (1976), Hungarian middle-distance runner who since 2009 has been naturalized Italian
 Judit Varga (art director) (1977), Hungarian art director, designer, squasher and snowboarder (nickname: Csuti)
 Judit Varga (composer) (1979), Hungarian composer and pianist who lives and works in Austria too
 Judit Varga (politician) (1980), Hungarian Minister of Justice